A number of proprietary software products are available for saving Web pages for later use offline. They vary in terms of the techniques used for saving, what types of content can be saved, the format and compression of the saved files, provision for working with already saved content, and in other ways.

HTML Content

See also 
 Comparison of web annotation systems
 Offline reader
 Progressive web application

Notes

ScrapBook

Archia

Video 
To save video embedded on web sites (e.g. YouTube), there are video download extensions for Firefox (including Download Helper) and Chrome.

References

Saving Web pages for offline use